Zachery "Zack" Mitchell (born 7 January 1993) is a Canadian professional ice hockey forward. He is currently an unrestricted free agent. He was last contract with HC Vityaz in the Kontinental Hockey League (KHL). He has previously played in the National Hockey League (NHL) with the Minnesota Wild.

Playing career
Mitchell played major junior hockey in his native Ontario, with the Guelph Storm of the Ontario Hockey League. Undrafted, Mitchel scored 83 points in 67 games in the 2013–14 season with the Storm. He completed his junior career with the Storm as the franchise leader in games played with 322 before he was signed by the Minnesota Wild to a three-year entry-level contract on 4 March 2014.

After attending his first training camp with the Wild, Mitchell was assigned to begin the 2014–15 season and his professional career with affiliate, the Iowa Wild of the AHL on 27 September 2014. In his rookie season with Iowa, Mitchell was the only player to appear in every regular season game, contributing with 17 goals and 35 points in 76 contests.

In the final year of his rookie contract, Mitchell received his first recall to the Wild in the 2016–17 season, on 9 November 2016. He made his debut the following night, in a victory over the Pittsburgh Penguins on 10 November 2016. He went on to appear in 11 games for Minnesota over the course of the season.

In the 2017–18 season, on 26 October 2017, Mitchell recorded his first NHL goal in an eventual 6-4 win against the New York Islanders, along with fellow rookie Luke Kunin. Mitchell was reassigned to Iowa later but Kunin stayed up. Mitchell was recalled from Iowa on 21 November 2017, while Joel Eriksson Ek and Luke Kunin were sent down. On 1 January 2018, Mitchell was placed on waivers by the Wild, and was then assigned to their AHL affiliate, the Iowa Wild, on 2 January. Mitchell finished the season playing in a career best 23 games with Minnesota, contributing with 3 goals and 5 points.

As a free agent from the Wild in the off-season, Mitchell joined his second NHL club in agreeing to a one-year, two-way contract with the Los Angeles Kings on 14 July 2018. In the 2018–19 season, Mitchell played exclusively with AHL affiliate, the Ontario Reign, posting 15 goals and 31 points in 61 games.

Leaving the Kings organization at the conclusion of his contract, Mitchell opted to sign his first contract abroad in agreeing to a one-year deal with Russian club, HC Neftekhimik Nizhnekamsk of the KHL on 1 July 2019. In his first season abroad in the 2019–20 season, Mitchell made a successful transition away from the North American style, registering 17 goal and 26 points in 54 regular season games with Nizhnekamsk.

At the conclusion of his contract, Mitchell left Nizhnekamsk as a free agent but continued in the KHL after securing a one-year contract with Latvian based club, Dinamo Riga, on August 4, 2020. Registering 6 goals and 9 points in 24 games, Mitchell was traded mid-season from Dinamo Riga to HC Dinamo Minsk on December 28, 2020.

After one season in the Swiss National League (NL) with SC Rapperswil-Jona Lakers, Mitchell returned to the KHL in agreeing to a one-year deal with HC Vityaz on June 14, 2022.

Career statistics

Regular season and playoffs

International

References

External links
 

1993 births
Living people
Canadian ice hockey right wingers
HC Dinamo Minsk players
Dinamo Riga players
Guelph Storm players
Iowa Wild players
Minnesota Wild players
HC Neftekhimik Nizhnekamsk players
Ontario Reign (AHL) players
SC Rapperswil-Jona Lakers players
Undrafted National Hockey League players